The 1949–50 network television schedule for the four major English language commercial broadcast networks in the United States. The schedule covers primetime hours from September 1949 through March 1950. The schedule is followed by a list per network of returning series, new series, and series cancelled after the 1948–49 season. This was the first season in which all four networks offered at least some prime time programming all seven nights of the week.

The schedule below reflects the fall lineup as it all settled into place throughout October 1949, before any subsequent time changes were made and additional new series appeared in November.

New series are highlighted in bold.

Notable debuts during the season included The Plainclothesman with its unusual camera work, the popular The Lone Ranger (which is one of the few 1940s television series to be given a DVD release), The Ed Wynn Show (a short-lived series featuring popular performers as guests and the first variety show from the West Coast), and the unsuccessful series The Life of Riley, one of the first sitcoms to be produced on film as opposed to live transmission. 
Continuing from the prior season were the highly popular variety series Toast of the Town, the critically well-received and popular anthology series Studio One, the critically panned but popular Captain Video and His Video Rangers which was one of the earliest sci-fi TV series, the well received by critics and viewers anthology series Kraft Television Theater, the popular Kukla, Fran and Ollie, and the popular in some regions drama/comedy The Goldbergs (which is also one of the few 1940s television series to be given a DVD release).

Legend

Sunday

Monday 

Notes: Beginning July 18, 1949, The Magic Cottage aired on DuMont Monday through Friday from 6:30 to 7:00 p.m. Eastern Time.

On NBC, The Black Robe aired at various times on Mondays from August through October 1949.

Tuesday 

Notes: Beginning July 18, 1949, The Magic Cottage aired on DuMont Monday through Friday from 6:30 to 7:00 p.m. Eastern Time.

Wednesday 

Manhattan Spotlight was replaced by Easy Aces from December 1949 to June 1950.
Notes: Beginning July 18, 1949, The Magic Cottage aired on DuMont Monday through Friday from 6:30 to 7:00 p.m. Eastern Time.

Thursday 

Notes: Beginning July 18, 1949, The Magic Cottage aired on DuMont Monday through Friday from 6:30 to 7:00 p.m. Eastern Time.

On NBC, The Black Robe aired from 8:00 to 8:30 p.m. Eastern Time from January to March 1950. The Wayne King Show was seen only on NBC's Midwest Network.

Friday 

Notes: Beginning July 18, 1949, The Magic Cottage aired on DuMont Monday through Friday from 6:30 to 7:00 p.m. Eastern Time.

Saturday 

Notes: In the half-hour preceding prime time, ABC aired one of the first television westerns, The Marshal of Gunsight Pass, with 22 live episodes between March 12 and September 30, 1950.

From January 28 to July 29, 1950, Dinner Date With Vincent Lopez aired Saturdays from 8 to 8:30pm ET on DuMont.

On NBC, The Black Robe aired from 10:00 to 10:30 p.m. on Saturday from November to December 1949 after airing at various times on Monday from August to October 1949.  Your Show of Shows premiered at 9:00 p.m. ET on Saturday, February 25, 1950.

By network

ABC

Returning Series
ABC Barn Dance
ABC Penthouse Players
Actors Studio
Author Meets the Critics
Blind Date
Buzzy Wuzzy
Celebrity Time
Club Seven
Crusade in Europe
Fun for the Money
Hollywood Screen Test
News and Views
On Trial
Paul Whiteman's TV Teen Club
Photoplay Time
Roller Derby
Stained Glass Windows
Think Fast
Tomorrow's Boxing Champions
Versatile Varieties
The Voice of Firestone
Wrestling from the Rainbo in Chicago
You Asked For It

New Series
Auction-Aire
The Boris Karloff Mystery Playhouse
Buck Rogers *
Let There Be Stars
Little Revue
The Lone Ranger
Majority Rules
Mama Rosa *
Mr. Black
Mysteries of Chinatown *
Oboler Comedy Theater
Paul Whiteman's Goodyear Revue
Photocrime
The Ruggles
Starring Boris Karloff
Volume One *
Your Show of Shows
Your Witness
Youth on the March

Not returning from 1948–49:
ABC Feature Film
ABC Television Players
America's Town Meeting
Critic at Large
Fashions on Parade
The Gay Nineties Revue
Kiernan's Corner
Movieland Quiz
Quizzing the News
The Southernaires Quartet
Sports with Joe Hasel
Stand By for Crime
Tales of the Red Caboose
Teenage Book Club
That Reminds Me
Three About Town
Wrestling from Washington, D.C.

CBS

Returning Series
54th Street Revue
Actors Studio (moved from ABC)
Arthur Godfrey and His Friends
Arthur Godfrey's Talent Scouts
The Bigelow Show
CBS Television News
Earl Wrightson at Home
The Fred Waring Show
Ford Theatre
The Goldbergs
In the First Person
International Boxing Club Bouts
Lamp Unto My Feet
Lucky Pup
Mama
Our Miss Brooks
People's Platform
Premiere Playhouse
The Roar of the Rails
Ruthie on the Telephone
The Sonny Kendis Show
Studio One
Suspense
The Ted Steele Show (moved from DuMont)
This is Show Business
Toast of the Town
To the Queen's Taste
Tonight on Broadway
The Week in Review
Your Sports Special

New Series
Abe Burrows' Almanac *
The Alan Young Show
Big Top *
The Bigelow Show
Capitol Cloak Room
Detective's Wife *
The Ed Wynn Show
Escape *
The Front Page
The Garry Moore Show *
Inside U.S.A. with Chevrolet
Joey Faye's Frolics *
The Ken Murray Show *
Man Against Crime
The Paul Arnold Show
Romance
The Show Goes On *
The Silver Theatre
Stage 13 *
The Stage Door *
Starlight Theatre *
Television Theatre *
The Trap *
Uptown Jubilee
The Web *
The Week in Sports

Not returning from 1948–49:
Adventures in Jazz
Capital Billy's Mississippi Music Hall
Kobbs' Korner
Face the Music
People's Platform
Places Please
Sportman's Quiz
Tournament of Champions
Wesley
What's It Worth

DuMont

Returning series
And Everything Nice
Bowling Headliners (moved from ABC)
Broadway to Hollywood
Captain Video and His Video Rangers
Cavalcade of Stars
Court of Current Issues
Cross Question
Feature Theater
Front Row Center
Johnny Olson's Rumpus Room
The Magic Cottage
Manhattan Spotlight
The Morey Amsterdam Show (moved from CBS)
Newsweek Views the News
Spin the Picture
The Vincent Lopez Show

New series
Adventure Playhouse *
The Al Morgan Show
Amanda
Amateur Boxing Fight Club
And Everything Nice
Cavalcade of Bands *
Chicagoland Mystery Players
Cinema Varieties
Country Style *
Dinner Date with Vincent Lopez *
Easy Aces
The Family Genius
Famous Jury Trials
Fishing and Hunting Club
Georgetown University Forum *
Hands of Mystery
The Hazel Scott Show *
Mystery Theater
The O'Neills
Okay, Mother
The Plainclothesman
Rocky King Detective *
Starlit Time *
Visit with the Armed Forces *
Windy City Jamboree *
Wrestling From Marigold

Not returning from 1948–49:
Admiral Broadway Revue
The Adventures of Oky Doky
The Alan Dale Show
Boxing From Jamaica Arena
Café de Paris
Camera Headlines
Champagne and Orchids
Charade Quiz
Doorway to Fame
The Growing Paynes
Hotel Broadway
I.N.S. Telenews
The Jack Eigen Show
Key to the Missing
King Cole's Birthday Party
The Laytons
Operation Success
The School House
Spin the Picture
The Stan Shaw Show
Teen Time Tunes
Window on the World
Wrestling From Columbia Park Arena

NBC

Returning Series
The Black Robe
Break the Bank
Candid Camera (moved from ABC)
Camel News Caravan
The Chesterfield Supper Club
Chevrolet Tele-Theater
The Clock
Colgate Theatre
Duffy's Tavern
Fireball-Fun-For-All
Fireside Theatre
Garroway at Large
Gillette Cavalcade of Sports
Greatest Fights of the Century
Hollywood Premiere
Hopalong Cassidy
Kraft Television Theatre
Kukla, Fran and Ollie
Leave It to the Girls
Leon Pearson and the News
Mary Kay and Johnny
Meet the Press
Meet Your Congress
Mixed Doubles
Mohawk Showroom
The Nature of Things
The Original Amateur Hour (moved from DuMont)
The Philco Television Playhouse
Quiz Kids
Texaco Star Theater
The Wayne King Show
We, the People
Who Said That?

New Series
The Armed Forces Hour
Armstrong Circle Theatre *
The Big Story
Bonny Maid Versatile Varieties
Cameo Theatre *
The Crisis
The Halls of Ivy *
Hawkins Falls, Population 6200
Leave It to the Girls
The Life of Riley
The Marshal of Gunsight Pass
Martin Kane, Private Eye
Mary Kay and Johnny
Masterpiece Playhouse *
Screen Directors Playhouse
Theatre of the Mind *
The Voice of Firestone
Your Show of Shows *

Not returning from 1948–49:
Admiral Broadway Revue
America Song
Americana
The Bigelow Show
Girl About Town
Girl of the Week
The Gulf Road Show Starring Bob Smith
The Hartmans
Mary Margaret McBride
Musical Merry-Go-Round
Musical Miniatures
NBC Presents
Picture This
Princess Sagaphi
Saturday Night Jamboree
Stop Me If You've Heard This One
The Swift Show
The Ted Steele Show
Television Screen Magazine
Theatre of the Mind
Village Barn
Admiral Presents the Five Star Revue — Welcome Aboard
You Are an Artist
Your Show Time

Note: The * indicates that the program was introduced in midseason.

References
 Bergmann, Ted; Skutch, Ira (2002). The DuMont Television Network: What Happened?. Lanham, Maryland: Scarecrow Press. .
 Castleman, H. & Podrazik, W. (1982). Watching TV: Four Decades of American Television. New York: McGraw-Hill. 314 pp.
 McNeil, Alex. Total Television. Fourth edition. New York: Penguin Books. .
 Brooks, Tim & Marsh, Earle (1964). The Complete Directory to Prime Time Network TV Shows (3rd ed.). New York: Ballantine. .

United States primetime network television schedules
1949 in American television
1950 in American television